Agu  is an Igbo surname.

People with the surname Agu

 Agu Aarna (1915–1989), Estonian chemist 
 Agu Casmir (born 1984), Nigerian professional soccer player
 Alloysius Agu (born 1967), Nigerian former football goalkeeper
 Chiwetalu Agu (born 1956), Nigerian film actor and producer
 Donald Agu (born 1975), Nigerian former footballer
 Festus Agu (born 1975), Nigerian former footballer
 Francis Agu (1965-2007), Nigerian actor
 Mikel Agu (born 1993), Nigerian footballer

References 

Igbo given names